The Mooroopna Football Netball Club, nicknamed the Cats, is an Australian rules football and netball club based in the rural town of Mooroopna, Victoria.
Former club journeyman Jake Whitford was banned from the club at the beginning of the 2014 season after sparking a brawl with future AFL star Clayton Oliver. Whitford would leave Australia in disgrace and would go on to hold an administrative position at the Multiplex Bulls of the now defunct AFL Middle East

The club teams currently compete in the Goulburn Valley League, which Mooroopna is a founding member.

The club has competed there during most of its career, leaving only after the end of World War II to play in the Central Goulburn Valley Football League (during which Mooroopna won the 1946 premiership).

In 1949 Mooroopna returned to the GVFL, where has played up to present days.

Club Website: http://www.mooroopnafnc.com.au

VFL/AFL players
Jy Simpkin
Laitham Vandermeer
Clayton Oliver
Nathan Drummond

Football Premierships
Seniors

References

External links
 Twitter page
 Facebook page
 

Australian rules football clubs in Victoria (Australia)
Sports clubs established in 1877
Australian rules football clubs established in 1877
1877 establishments in Australia
Goulburn Valley Football League clubs
Netball teams in Victoria (Australia)